Chlorophyll c refers to forms of chlorophyll found in certain marine algae, including the photosynthetic Chromista (e.g. diatoms and brown algae) and dinoflagellates. These pigments are characterized by their unusual chemical structure, with a porphyrin as opposed to the chlorin (which has a reduced ring D) as the core; they also do not have an isoprenoid tail. Both these features stand out from the other chlorophylls commonly found in algae and plants.

It has a blue-green color and is an accessory pigment, particularly significant in its absorption of light in the 447–52 nm wavelength region. Like chlorophyll a and chlorophyll b, it helps the organism gather light and passes a quanta of excitation energy through the light harvesting antennae to the photosynthetic reaction centre.

Chlorophyll c can be further divided into chlorophyll c1, chlorophyll c2, and chlorophyll c3, plus at least eight other more recently found subtypes.

Chlorophyll c1

Chlorophyll c1 is a common form of chlorophyll c. It differs from chlorophyll c2 in its C8 group, having an ethyl group instead of vinyl group (C-C single bond instead of C=C double bond).
Its absorption maxima are around 444, 577, 626 nm and 447, 579, 629 nm in diethyl ether and acetone respectively.

Chlorophyll c2

Chlorophyll c2 is the most common form of chlorophyll c. 
Its absorption maxima are around 447, 580, 627 nm and 450, 581, 629 nm in diethyl ether and acetone respectively.

Chlorophyll c3

Chlorophyll c3 is a form of chlorophyll c found in microalga Emiliania huxleyi, identified in 1989.
Its absorption maxima are around 452, 585, 625 nm and 452, 585, 627 nm in diethyl ether and acetone respectively.

Biosynthesis 
Chlorophyll c synthesis branches off early from the typical Chlorophyllide synthesis pathway, after divinylprotochlorophyllide (DV-PChlide) is formed. DV-PChlide can be processed directly by an unidentified 171 oxidase into Chl c2. An 8-vinyl reductase (elaborating on the promiscous behavior of ferredoxin-type 3,8-divinyl chlorophyllide reductase) could then convert Chl c2 into Chl c1. The two steps could be swapped for the same effect.

The 171 oxidtion appears to proceed by "hydroxylation of the 17-propionate reside at the 171-position and successive dehydration to the 17-acrylate residue."

References 

Porphyrins
Photosynthetic pigments
Brown algae
Diatom biology